Recrystallization may refer to:

Recrystallization (chemistry)
Recrystallization (geology)
Recrystallization (metallurgy)

sv:Omkristallisation
de:Rekristallisation
nl:Herkristallisatie
ja:再結晶
simple:Recrystallisation
zh:重结晶